The U-NO Bar is produced by the Annabelle Candy Company.

The U-NO is a truffle type bar with almond bits covered in a thin layer of chocolate, and wrapped in a silver foil-like wrapper. It is comparable to a 3 Musketeers bar in appearance but has a higher fat per gram ratio. Its center is a chocolate, truffle-like fluff covered in a thin layer of milk chocolate and ground almonds. U-NO bars used to come in two flavors: Original and Mint. Annabelle Candy Company has since discontinued the mint flavor..

U-NO was first produced by the Cardinet Candy Company in the 1920s, which was later acquired by the Annabelle Candy Company in 1978.

Nutritional Information 
According to the label, an U-NO bar (38.3g) has 235 calories, 10 grams of saturated fat, 16 grams of total fat, 12 grams of sugar, 3 grams of protein, and 42mg of sodium.

Ingredients 
Milk Chocolate (Contains: Sugar, Cocoa Butter, Chocolate Liquor, Whole Milk Powder, Soy Lecithin as an Emulsifier, Natural Vanilla Flavor), Sugar, Hydrogenated Coconut Oil, Hydrogenated Palm Kernel Oil, Cocoa Powder, Nonfat Milk Powder, Whey Powder, Almonds Roasted Almonds, Soy Lecithin, Artificial Flavor (Vanillin), Salt.

Made in a facility that uses: Milk, Eggs, Wheat, Tree Nuts, and Peanuts.

References

External links
 Annabelle Candy Company - Official website
 U-No Bar Review

Chocolate bars
Annabelle Candy Company brands
Brand name confectionery